Dimorphotheca fruticosa is a perennial herb in the genus Dimorphotheca found in coastal areas and native to South Africa.

References 

fruticosa
Flora of South Africa